Ramalina rigidella is a species of saxicolous (rock-dwelling), fruticose lichen in the family Ramalinaceae. It is found in the remote tropical island of Saint Helena, where it occurs on boulders and cliffs throughout the island. It was formally described as a new species in 2008 by Dutch lichenologist André Aptroot. Thin-layer chromatography shows that the species contains usnic acid, norstictic acid, and connorstictic acid. The photobiont partner is dispersed in irregular groups throughout the medulla. The author suggests that, based on the length of some observed specimens on exposed cliffs, some individuals might be up to 500 years old.

References

External links
 Pictures of Tropical Lichens – Image of species 

rigidella
Lichen species
Lichens described in 2008
Taxa named by André Aptroot
Lichens of the middle Atlantic Ocean